The  is a member of the Cabinet of Japan and is the leader and chief executive of the Ministry of Economy, Trade and Industry. The minister is also a statutory member of the National Security Council, and is nominated by the Prime Minister of Japan and is appointed by the Emperor of Japan.

The current minister is Yasutoshi Nishimura, who took office on 10 August 2022.

List of Ministers of Economy, Trade and Industry (2001–)

References